The 2011 Siberia Cup was a professional tennis tournament played on Hard courts. It was the first edition of the tournament which was part of the 2011 ITF Women's Circuit. It took place in Tyumen, Russia between 26 and 30 December.

WTA entrants

Seeds

 1 Rankings are as of December 19, 2011.

Other entrants
The following players received wildcards into the singles main draw:
  Margarita Gasparyan
  Daria Gavrilova
  Nina Khrisanova
  Natalia Zhuravleva

The following players received entry from the qualifying draw:
  Olga Doroshina
  Polina Monova
  Sviatlana Pirazhenka
  Ekaterina Semenova

The following player received entry from a Special Ranking spot:
  Darya Kustova

Champions

Singles

 Yulia Putintseva def.  Elina Svitolina, 6–2, 6–4

Doubles

 Darya Kustova /  Olga Savchuk def.  Natela Dzalamidze /  Margarita Gasparyan, 6–0, 6–2

External links
Official Website
ITF Search 

2011 ITF Women's Circuit
2011 in Russian tennis
2011
December 2011 sports events in Russia
2011 in Russian women's sport